Jacqui Hames is an English journalist, television presenter and former police officer.

Career
Jacqui Hames was a presenter of the BBC programme Crimewatch from 1990 until 2007. In 2008, she published Savvy! with Fiona Bruce. In 2012, she gave evidence to the Leveson inquiry after she was a victim of the phone hacking scandal. Hames has since presented programmes on Sky News and the BBC and regularly appears on Good Morning Britain, This Morning and LBC.

References

External links

Year of birth missing (living people)
Living people
English women journalists
English television presenters
BBC television presenters
Women Metropolitan Police officers
21st-century British journalists
20th-century British journalists
Metropolitan Police officers
20th-century English women
20th-century English people
21st-century English women
21st-century English people